Illinois Route 90 (IL 90) is an east–west state highway in northern Peoria County in central Illinois. It runs from IL 78 north of Laura to IL 40 south of Edelstein.

Route description

IL 90 is an undivided two-lane surface road for its entire length. It passes north of the community of Monica and through the village of Princeville.

History
SBI Route 90 ran from Laura in Peoria County to Sparland in Marshall County along current Illinois 90, IL 17 and IL 40. This was changed to its current alignment in 1938.

Major intersections

References

Transportation in Peoria County, Illinois
090